The Laugh on Dad is a 1918 comedy Australian silent film. It is considered a lost film.

Plot
John Forrest, aka Dad, is an ostrich farmer. His daughter Jean wants to marry Ralph Bond but Dad is opposed, so he devises a scene where a farmhand will dress as Jean and pretend to marry Ralph. Jean outwits him and the marriage goes ahead.

Cast
Netta Lawson as Jean Forrest
Johnson Weir as John Forrest
May Morton as May
Mrs Tinsdale as Mrs Dumpling
Jules Olaff as Arthur Elliott
Alwyn West as Jim
Olaf Jensen as Ralph Bond
Charles Clarke

Production
The film was the first production of the Austral Photoplay Company, run by film importer and entrepreneur A.C. Tinsdale. Finance was raised by means of public subscription, offering two shilling shares to the public; buying one hundred shares got you free motion picture tuition and a part in the film. Most of the cast paid to appear in the movie.

The movie was shot at a real life ostrich farm in South Head.

Release
The film had trouble securing bookings but the same method of raising finance was used to find production of a sequel, Dad Becomes a Grandad (1918).

Tinsdale was later sued by an investor for not paying out his obligations under the film and settled out of court.

References

External links
 
 The Laugh On Dad at National Film and Sound Archive

Australian black-and-white films
Lost Australian films
1918 films
1918 comedy-drama films
Australian comedy-drama films
Australian silent feature films
1918 lost films
Lost comedy-drama films
Silent comedy-drama films